The 1982 Volvo Women's Cup was a women's tennis tournament played on outdoor hard courts at the Ramapo College in Mahwah, New Jersey in the United States, It was part of the Toyota International Series circuit of the 1982 WTA Tour and classified as a Category 3 event. It was the fifth edition of the tournament and was held from August 23 through August 29, 1982. Unseeded Leigh-Anne Thompson won the singles title and earned $18,000 first-prize money.

Finals

Singles
 Leigh-Anne Thompson defeated  Bettina Bunge 7–6(7–4), 6–3
It was Thompson's only title of her career.

Doubles
 Barbara Potter /  Sharon Walsh defeated  Rosie Casals /  Wendy Turnbull 6–1, 6–4

Prize money

References

External links
 ITF tournament edition details

1982 WTA Tour
1982 Volvo Women's Cup
1982 in sports in New Jersey
1982 in American tennis
August 1982 sports events in the United States